Physostigma is a genus of flowering plants in the family Fabaceae. It belongs to the subfamily Faboideae.

Species in the genus include:
 Physostigma coriaceum Merxm.
 Physostigma cylindrospermum (Welw. ex Baker) Holmes
 Physostigma laxius Merxm.
 Physostigma mesoponticum Taub.
 Physostigma venenosum Balf.

References

Phaseoleae
Taxa named by John Hutton Balfour
Fabaceae genera